Milanville is a village in Damascus Township, Wayne County, Pennsylvania, United States.

Geography
Milanville is located along the Delaware River and the New York border north of Narrowsburg, New York.

References

Unincorporated communities in Wayne County, Pennsylvania
Unincorporated communities in Pennsylvania